Yuxi railway station may refer to:

 Yuxi railway station (Yunnan), on the Kunming–Yuxi–Hekou railway and Yuxi–Mohan railway
 Yuxi railway station (Fujian), a planned station